South Essex (formally the Southern division of Essex) was a county constituency represented in the House of Commons of the Parliament of the United Kingdom from 1832 to 1885. It elected two Members of Parliament (MPs) using the bloc vote system.

History 
The constituency was created by the Reform Act 1832, with effect from the general election in December 1832, when the former Essex constituency was divided into Northern and Southern divisions.

Areas covered

 The place for "holding of courts for election of members" from 1867 became Brentwood under the 1867 Act.

Boundaries
1832–1868: The Hundreds of Barstable, Becontree, Chafford, Chelmsford, Dengie, Harlow, Ongar, Rochford, and Waltham, and the Liberty of Havering.

1868–1885: The Hundreds of Becontree, Chafford, Barstable, and Rochford, with the Liberty of Havering.

Members of Parliament

Election results

Elections in the 1830s

Dare's death caused a by-election.

Elections in the 1840s

Elections in the 1850s

Elections in the 1860s

Elections in the 1870s

Elections in the 1880s

References

Sources

Parliamentary constituencies in Essex (historic)
Constituencies of the Parliament of the United Kingdom established in 1832
Constituencies of the Parliament of the United Kingdom disestablished in 1885